Scor or SCOR may refer to:
 Supply-chain operations reference, a process reference model.
 Scór, a division of the Gaelic Athletic Association.
 Society and College of Radiographers (SCoR), a British professional body representing Radiographers within the UK.
 SCOR SE, a global reinsurer based in France.
 South Coast Railway zone (SCoR), the 18th railway zone announced in India.
 Scientific Committee on Oceanic Research (SCOR), a body of the International Science Council